Rafiq Salah-Edine Khaleel (born 24 February 2003) is an English professional footballer who plays as a midfielder for League Two club Crawley Town.

Early and personal life
Khaleel was born in Camden, and is of Moroccan descent.

Career
He played youth football for Camden Elite and Cheshunt.

On 28 February 2020, Khaleel signed for League Two club Crawley Town on a two-and-a-half year deal. He made his debut for the club on 13 October 2020 as a second-half substitute for Samuel Matthews in a 2–1 EFL Trophy defeat to Arsenal U21, before making his full debut the following month in a 2–0 home victory over Ipswich Town, again in the EFL Trophy. He joined Premier League side West Ham United on a trial spell in April 2021.

In November 2021, he joined Southern League Premier Division South club Kings Langley on loan until January 2022. He made his debut as a 63rd minute substitute in a 2–1 win over Hayes & Yeading on 27 November 2021. He made 2 appearances on loan at the club.

On 1 February 2022, Khaleel joined Southern League Premier Division South side Gosport Borough on loan for the remainder of the 2021–22 season. He made his debut for the club as a substitute in their 1–0 win away to Hendon later that day.

Career statistics

References

External links
 

2003 births
Living people
Footballers from Camden Town
English footballers
English people of Moroccan descent
Association football midfielders
Crawley Town F.C. players
Kings Langley F.C. players
Gosport Borough F.C. players
Southern Football League players